Aye Min Han (born 20 May 1983) is a Burmese politician who is an Amyotha Hluttaw MP for Mon State No. 1 Constituency.

He is a member of the National League for Democracy. He was born in Mon State. His previous job is trader.

Political career
He is a member of the National League for Democracy. In the 2015 Myanmar general election, he was elected as an Amyotha Hluttaw MP, winning a majority of 38309 votes and elected representative from Mon State No. 1 parliamentary constituency. And then he served as a member of Women's and Children's Rights Committee at Amyotha Hluttaw.

References

National League for Democracy politicians
1983 births
Living people
People from Mon State